Khatt-e Ahi (also Romanized as Khaţţ-e Āhī) is a village in Harazpey-ye Gharbi Rural District, in the Central District of Mahmudabad County, Mazandaran Province, Iran. At the 2006 census, its population was 733, in 193 families.

References 

Populated places in Mahmudabad County